"Jail Guitar Doors" is a song by the Clash, recorded during October and November 1977 and released on 17 February 1978 as the B-side of their fourth single "Clash City Rockers". The song is featured on the U.S. release of their debut album, and on their 2006 compilations album the Singles Box.

It began life as "Lonely Mother's Son" by Joe Strummer's former band The 101ers, sharing the same chorus, which begins, "Clang clang go the jail guitar doors."

"Jail Guitar Doors" was covered by the former Guns N' Roses guitarist Gilby Clarke, who recorded a version on his debut solo album, Pawnshop Guitars, with the contribution of the members of Guns N' Roses, Pixies vocalist Frank Black, guitarist Ryan Roxie and bassist Duff McKagan.

The song opens with the lines "Let me tell you 'bout Wayne and his deals of cocaine", which is a reference to the MC5 guitarist Wayne Kramer. In the second verse line, "And I'll tell you 'bout Pete, didn't want no fame" refers to Peter Green. The third verse line, "And then there's Keith, waiting for trial" refers to Rolling Stones' guitarist Keith Richards. Kramer later performed "Jail Guitar Doors" in concert.

Jail Guitar Doors initiative
Jail Guitar Doors is an independent initiative set up by Billy Bragg with the aim of providing musical equipment for the use of inmates serving time in prisons and funding individual projects such as recording sessions in UK prisons and for former inmates throughout the United Kingdom. It takes its name from the b-side of the Clash's 1978 single "Clash City Rockers". Jail Guitar Doors, USA is an independent initiative set up by Wayne Kramer, Billy Bragg and Margaret Saadi Kramer in the United States in 2009. Jail Guitar Doors aims to provide musical instruments to inmates across the United States, assists in coordinating volunteer teaching programs, and organizes prison outreach programs. JGD advances new solutions to diminish prison violence and works toward policy reform. Wayne Kramer and Jail Guitar Doors USA volunteers visited their 100th prison on Friday, Sept. 8, 2017.

Notes

References

 
 
 
 
 
 

1979 songs
The Clash songs
Songs about prison